Brice P. Sensabaugh (born October 30, 2003) is an American college basketball player for the Ohio State Buckeyes of the Big Ten Conference.

Early life and high school career
Sensabaugh grew up in Orlando, Florida and attended Lake Highland Preparatory School. He was the team's leading scorer as a sophomore but missed his entire junior season due to a meniscus injury. Sensabaugh averaged 25.1 points, 7.2 rebounds, and 1.5 assists per game as a senior and was named Florida Mr. Basketball. He was rated a four-star recruit and committed to playing college basketball for Ohio State over offers from Alabama, Georgia Tech, and Florida. After graduating from high school, Sensabaugh played in the pro–am Kingdom Summer League in Ohio and scored 51 points in a game.

College career
Sensabaugh entered his freshman season at Ohio State as a key reserve off of the bench. Sensabaugh was named the Big Ten Conference Freshman of the Week for three straight weeks.

Career statistics

College

|-
| style="text-align:left;"| 2022–23
| style="text-align:left;"| Ohio State
| 33 || 21 || 24.5 || .480 || .405 || .830 || 5.4 || 1.2 || .5 || .4 || 16.3

References

External links
Ohio State Buckeyes bio

2003 births
Living people
American men's basketball players
Basketball players from Florida
Small forwards
Ohio State Buckeyes men's basketball players